Hobovše pri Stari Oselici is a dispersed settlement south of Stara Oselica in the Municipality of Gorenja Vas–Poljane in the Upper Carniola region of Slovenia.

Name
The name Hobovše pri Stari Oselici means 'Hobovše near Stara Oselica'. The village was attested in historical sources as Chotwůsse in 1291, Chotwůsche in 1318, and Chadbuesch in 1500. The name is believed to derive from the plural demonym *Hotebǫďe-vьsʼane 'residents of Hotebǫdъ's village', referring to an early individual associated with the settlement.

References

External links 

Hobovše pri Stari Oselici on Geopedia

Populated places in the Municipality of Gorenja vas-Poljane